EU06 (also manufactured as AEI E) is a class of electric locomotives in service with the Polish state railway PKP.

Technical details
EU06 has driving cabs at both ends. The locomotives are equipped for multiple working which allows one driver to drive two coupled engines from one cab. These figures apply to driving on level gradients.

All members and panels are made of Cor-Ten steel and the underframe is a shallow, cellular structure with closely spaced light-gauge longitudinal and transverse members plated above and below to make a set of closed cells.

The body sides are built up on rectangular vertical tubes forming a set of pillars and are double-skinned for additional strength and rigidity. This maintains the shape of the locomotive allowing the roof of the entire machine space between the two cabs to be removed to allow machinery to be lifted out and replaced. English Electric made extensive use of aluminium alloys and GRP for panelling, doors and ducts.

Current collection is by single-pan air operated pantographs, which feed the main power circuits by a high-speed circuit breaker. The main resistances were made by Metropolitan-Vickers' parent company, Associated Electrical Industries. The four traction motors are permanently connected in series pairs, with series-parallel combinations between pairs. Parallel and 12 field weakening positions give a total of 55 running notches. The four traction motors have Alstom quill drives.

The  minimum curve radius that the locomotives can negotiate is : any curve tighter than this could cause severe flange wear on the wheels. In order to reduce flange forces, the bogies are linked by a tubular-framed spring-loaded inter-coupling and flange lubricators are fitted to each wheel.

History
In 1936–1938 the Contractors' Committee, a joint venture of Metropolitan-Vickers and English Electric, had supplied six  electric locomotives and 80 three-car electric multiple units for the electrification of Warsaw suburban services. British Insulated Cables supplied the overhead line equipment. In 1945 British Insulated merged with a competitor to become British Insulated Callender's Cables, and in 1949 Metropolitan-Vickers, English Electric and BICC contracts to replace locomotives, EMUs and equipment damaged in the Second World War.

In the early 1950s PKP urgently wanted mixed-traffic electric locomotives for the rapid electrification of Poland's railways. ET21 freight locomotives were already in production but there was a lack of passenger locomotives. The plan was to buy several items of foreign-built locomotives and a license and start domestic production afterwards.

In 1956 talks with companies from Austria and Switzerland started, but were broken off soon after. In June 1959 Poland awarded a new contract to for overhead electrification and 20 locomotives to the Contractors' Committee, which now included BICC as well as AEI Traction and English Electric. The contract included a licence agreement for Poland to manufacture 2,000 tons of copper contact wire, enough to electrify  of railway.

Not all electric devices were included in the licence agreement. EU06 locomotives are roughly similar to the British Rail Class 83 mechanically, which were built by English Electric at Vulcan Foundry, Newton-le-Willows in the UK, in the same period; electrically the layout and equipment was similar to classes 5E/5E1/6E/6E1 operating on South African Railways.

The first EU06 locomotive was delivered to Poland early in 1962 and after series of trials it was assigned to Kraków Prokocim depot. Seven locomotives had been delivered by the end of April 1962 and 19 by the end of the year. Delivery of the last locomotive was delayed until 1965 by failures of the armature. The locomotives were operated on all lines serviced by Kraków Prokocim depot.

Class EU06 was an innovative design that became a milestone in Polish motive power construction. Along with the EU07, a similar locomotive class built in Poland under licence by Pafawag in Wrocław and Ciegielski in Poznań, almost 500 locomotives were built. EU07 locomotives were also used to build the duplex freight locomotives of PKP class ET41. Several construction innovations from class EU06 were introduced into later classes such as EP08, ET22 and EP09. The Last EU06 unit traveled from Žylina to Katowice on March 31, 2009, in the middle of December 2010, 7 out of the 14 remaining locomotives were scrapped on Kraków Prokocim Cargo Station, Those 7 locomotives were: EU06-02, EU06-04, EU06-05, EU06-08, EU06-11, EU06-14 and EU06-16. The 1st locomotive (EU06-01) ended its service in 2004, due to its locomotive technical performance certificate expiring. In the same year in 2012, EU06-01 became an active monument in Chabówka Railway Heritage Park. The Rest of the active locomotives are left off, mostly awaiting better times, which are mostly main repairs.

Liveries
English Electric delivered the EU06 class in a two-tone green, with a broad dark green waistband on a pale green body.

In recognition of the locomotives being built in the UK, it was hoped that one example of the class would be repainted in British Rail Electric Blue livery, complete with BR Lion and Wheel insignia. Instead, an EU07 /EP07 — EP07-1051 — was painted in the livery in February 2008.

Nicknames
Szóstka ("The six") – from the class number
Anglik ("Englishman") – from the country of origin

See also
Polish locomotives designation

References

Further reading

Bo′Bo′ locomotives
3000 V DC locomotives
Polish State Railways electric locomotives
Railway locomotives introduced in 1962
Standard gauge locomotives of Poland
Bo′Bo′ electric locomotives of Europe